Who Is Hope Schuyler? is a 1942 American action film directed by Thomas Z. Loring and written by Arnaud d'Usseau. The film stars Joseph Allen, Mary Howard, Sheila Ryan, Ricardo Cortez, Janis Carter and Joan Valerie. The film was released on April 17, 1942, by 20th Century Fox.

Plot

Cast   
Joseph Allen as Tom Mason 
Mary Howard as Diane Rossiter
Sheila Ryan as Lee Dale
Ricardo Cortez as Anthony Pearce
Janis Carter as Vesta Hadden
Joan Valerie as Phyllis Guerney
Robert Lowery as Robert Scott
Rose Hobart as Alma Pearce
Paul Guilfoyle as Carl Spence
William Newell as Perley Seymour
Pat Flaherty as Nash
Charles Trowbridge as Judge Rossiter
Frank Puglia as Baggott
Edwin Stanley as Gillian Stafford
Edward Keane as Judge
Cliff Clark as Lt. Palmer
Jeff Corey as Medical Examiner
Byron Foulger as George

References

External links 
 

1942 films
20th Century Fox films
American action films
1940s action films
Films scored by David Raksin
American black-and-white films
Films directed by Thomas Z. Loring
1940s English-language films
1940s American films